Aquamarine is a pale-blue to light-green variety of beryl. The color of aquamarine can be changed by heat.

Aquamarine has a chemical composition of Be3Al2Si6O18, also containing Fe2+. It has a hardness of 7.5 to 8. Aquamarine contains no or few noticeable inclusions but it can have inclusions like mica, hematite, or salt-water.

Aquamarine is a common gemstone. However, there is a rarer deep blue variant called maxixe, but its color can fade due to sunlight. The color of maxixe is caused by NO3. Dark-blue maxixe color can be produced in green, pink or yellow beryl by irradiating it with high-energy radiation (gamma rays, neutrons or even X-rays).

Name and etymology 
The word aquamarine was first used in the year 1677.

The word aquamarine has been used as a modifier for other minerals like aquamarine tourmaline, aquamarine emerald, aquamarine chrysolite, aquamarine sapphire, or aquamarine topaz.

Value 

Aquamarine is inexpensive due to its abundance. It is more expensive than blue topaz but costs less than emerald or bixbite.

The value of aquamarine is determined by its weight, color, cut or clarity. Cut aquamarines that are over 25 carats will have a lower price per carat than smaller ones of the same quality.

Natural truly blue aquamarine is very expensive.

In culture 
Aquamarine is referred to as the birth stone for the month of March. Aquamarine has historically been used a symbol for youth and happiness due to its color, which has also, along with its name, made Western culture connect it with the ocean. Ancient Romans believed that aquamarine could protect people who are travelling across the sea, they also used aquamarine to prevent illnesses.

The Chinese used it to make seals, figurines, and engravings. Japanese people used aquamarine to make netsuke.

It became a state gem for Colorado in 1971.

Occurrence 

Aquamarine can be found in countries like Afghanistan, China, Kenya, Pakistan, Russia, Mozambique, the United States,  Brazil, Nigeria, Madagascar, Zambia, Tanzania, Sri Lanka, Malawi, India, Zimbabwe, Australia, Myanmar, and Namibia. The state of Minas Gerais is a major source for aquamarine.

Aquamarine can mostly be found in granite pegmatites. Aquamarine can also be found in veins of metamorphic rocks that became mineralized by hydrothermal activity.

Notable aquamarine

See also
 List of gemstones
 List of minerals

References 

Gemstones
Beryl group